Aucana is a genus of cellar spiders that was first described by B. A. Huber in 2000.

Species
 it contains five species, found only in Chile and on New Caledonia:
Aucana kaala Huber, 2000 – New Caledonia
Aucana paposo Huber, 2000 – Chile
Aucana petorca Huber, 2000 – Chile
Aucana platnicki Huber, 2000 (type) – Chile
Aucana ramirezi Huber, 2000 – Chile

See also
 List of Pholcidae species

References

Araneomorphae genera
Pholcidae
Spiders of Oceania
Spiders of South America